Échirolles is a commune in the Isère department in southeastern France. Part of the Grenoble urban unit (agglomeration), it is the second-largest suburb of the city of Grenoble, which is immediately to its north.

History
A former industrial village had the majority of its inhabitants work in the viscose factories, a fabric that was invented in Échirolles in 1884 by the French scientist and industrial Hilaire de Chardonnet, before becoming universally famous. The process for manufacturing viscose was then patented by three British scientists, Charles Frederick Cross, Edward John Bevan and Clayton Beadle, in 1891.

Population

Personalities
 Thernand Bakouboula footballer
 Seynabou Benga handball player
 Stephane Biakolo footballer
 Talel Chedly (b. 1978), footballer
 Vincent Clerc (b. 1981), rugby footballer of Stade Toulousain and of the France national team.
 Mélissa Theuriau (b. 1978), journalist.
 Calogero (b. 1971), pop/rock singer, composer and songwriter.
 Laure Péquegnot (b. 1975), skier.
 Gérald Hustache-Mathieu (b. 1968), film director and scenarist.
 David di Tommaso (1979–2005), football player.
 Sami Bouajila (b. 1966), actor.
 Guilbaut Colas (b. 18 June 1983), freestyle skier.
 David Lazzaroni (b. 4 February 1985), ski jumper.
 Sandrine Aubert (b. 6 October 1982), alpine skier.
 Jonathan Tinhan footballer

International relations
Échirolles is twinned with:
  Grugliasco, Italy
  Honhoue, Benin
  Novovolynsk, Ukraine
  Kimberley, England

See also
Musée Géo-Charles

References

External links

 Official website
 Official website of the Paroisse Charles de Foucauld in Échirolles
 Museum of viscose in Échirolles

Communes of Isère
Arpitania